The 2021 Sporting Kansas City II season is the club's second year under the name of Sporting Kansas City II, sixth year of play and their third season in the Eastern Conference of the USL Championship, the top tier of United Soccer League and the second tier of the United States Soccer Pyramid. The team will continue play at Children's Mercy Park.

Due to the ongoing COVID-19 pandemic, for the 2021 season, the league split each of the conferences further into two divisions, Atlantic and Central in the Eastern Conference and Mountain and Pacific in the Western Conference. During the regular season, each Central Division team will play its division opponents four times – twice home and twice away – for a total of 28 games. The remaining four games in SKC II's schedule will be played against regional or cross-conference opponents, namely Colorado, LA Galaxy II, El Paso, and Oakland.

Roster

Competitions

USL Championship

Central Division Standings

Match results

USL Cup Playoffs

U.S. Open Cup

Due to their ownership by a higher division professional club (Sporting Kansas City), SKC II is one of 15 teams expressly forbidden from entering the Cup competition.

See also
 Sporting Kansas City II
 2021 in American soccer
 2021 USL Championship season

References

Sporting Kansas City II
Sporting Kansas City II
Sporting Kansas City II seasons
Sporting Kansas City II